USS Gabilan (SS-252), a Gato-class submarine, was the only ship of the United States Navy to be named for the gabilan, an eagle ray of the Gulf of California.

Construction and commissioning
Gabilan′s keel was laid down by the Electric Boat Co., Groton, Connecticut, on 5 January 1943. She was launched 19 September 1943, sponsored by Mrs. Eleanor James, wife of Rear Admiral Jules James, and commissioned on 28 December 1943, Commander K. R. Wheland in command.

First and second war patrols, April – August 1944 
After shakedown out of New London, Gabilan sailed for brief antisubmarine training at Key West before transiting the Panama Canal for the Hawaiian Islands. She arrived Pearl Harbor 23 March 1944 and spent her first war patrol (21 April – 6 June) scouting the Mariana Islands gathering information for the United States invasion of those islands. Her second war patrol (29 June – 18 August) took her to the south coast of Honshū, Japan, where, on the night of 17 July, she made a daring radar chase through bright moonlight and phosphorescent water. Skirting dangerous reefs and shoals, she pressed home an attack that sank a 492-ton minesweeper.

Third and fourth war patrols, September 1944 – February 1945 
The latter part of the patrol was spent in an independent search of approaches of Kii Suido where, in a dawn periscope attack on 31 October, she destroyed oceanographic research vessel Kaiyō No. 6 with a single torpedo. Gabilan terminated her third war patrol at Saipan on 12 November 1944 and proceeded to Brisbane, Australia for refit.

Her fourth war patrol was in the South China Sea (29 December 1944 – 15 February 1945). There were many quick dives to avoid aircraft; floating mines were sunk by rifle fire from the submarine, but there was no sign of their quarry.

Passing back through the Java Sea en route to Fremantle, Australia, the submarine had a nerve-wracking morning, as numerous aircraft dropped depth charges in the near vicinity, culminated by the appearance of a Japanese minelayer that made two attacks in shallow water, dropping 20 depth charges. Thoroughly shaken, but suffering only superficial damage, Gabilan evaded her antagonist in a providential heavy rain squall. Her only other diversion en route to Fremantle was an encounter with the British submarine , an approaching target in morning twilight; however, there was sufficient illumination to enable Gabilan to identify Spiteful at the last moment before firing.

Fifth and sixth war patrols, March – August 1945 
Gabilan conducted the greater part of her fifth war patrol (20 March – 28 May) as a unit of a "wolfpack" that included  and Besugo. Patrolling below the Celebes, the pack began an epic four-day chase on 4 April with a morning contact on cruiser Isuzu and her four escorts. One of the escorts fell prey to Besugo, and the elusive cruiser was spotted as she entered Bima Bay on the night of 6 April. Word was flashed to Gabilan, already executing a daring surface attack that left the cruiser listing and down by the bow. With the enemy confused by Gabilans attack, Charr completed the kill with a six-torpedo salvo the next morning (7 April). The demise of Isuzu, last of the Japanese light cruisers to fall victim to a submarine torpedo, was witnessed by British submarine .

Gabilan outwitted three escorts to sink a small freighter the morning of 14 April 1945, then scored hits on two cargo ships of another convoy. After a short stay off the coast of Hainan, where she destroyed drifting mines, she returned to Pearl Harbor 28 May for refit.
 
Gabilan'''s sixth and last war patrol (20 June – 17 August 1945) was on lifeguard station for American fliers off Tokyo Bay. She first rescued six men, the crews of two torpedo bombers, then raced well inside Tokyo Bay, in easy range of Japanese shore batteries, to rescue another three-man crew. Six Navy Hellcat fighter planes gave her cover for the mission. On the way out, she paused to destroy a drifting mine with gunfire.

On 1 August 1945, Gabilan rendezvoused with the submarine  and received three British fliers Toro had rescued earlier. Altogether, Gabilan rescued 17 aviators during her patrol.

Post-World War II
En route to Pearl Harbor, Gabilan received news of the surrender of Japan on 15 August 1945. Proceeding by way of San Francisco, California, and the Panama Canal Zone, Gabilan arrived at New London, Connecticut, where she decommissioned 23 February 1946 and joined the Atlantic Reserve Fleet. She was sold for scrapping 15 December 1959.

Honors and awardsGabilan'' received four battle stars for World War II service. Her second, third, fifth, and sixth war patrols were designated "successful".

References

Citations

Bibliography
 Hinman, Charles R., and Douglas E. Campbell. The Submarine Has No Friends: Friendly Fire Incidents Involving U.S. Submarines During World War II. Syneca Research Group, Inc., 2019. .

External links 
 navsource.org: USS Gabilan

Gato-class submarines
World War II submarines of the United States
Ships built in Groton, Connecticut
1943 ships
Maritime incidents in July 1945
Friendly fire incidents of World War II